Saravjit Kaur Manuke (25 July 1972) is an Indian politician and the MLA in the Punjab Legislative Assembly representing the Jagraon Assembly constituency. She is a member of the Aam Aadmi Party.

The first time she contested election in 2017 on the ticket of Aam Aadmi Party and won. In May 2017 she was elected Deputy Leader of Opposition in Punjab Assembly.

Early life
She has M.Com and M.A. in Economics, degrees.

Political career
Saravjit Kaur Manuke was employed in the teaching profession at the beginning of her career. She then quit her job and joined the Aam Aadmi Party, founded by prominent Indian politician Arvind Kejriwal.

Member of Legislative Assembly (First term)
She contested the Jagraon Assembly constituency from the Aam Aadmi Party in the  2017 Punjab Legislative Assembly election. She won the elections for the first time. She defeated former Punjab state government minister, vice-president of the Punjab state Congress committee and veteran politician Malkit Singh Dakha, who was twice elected as an MLA in the Punjab assembly.

Saravjit Kaur Manuke received 61,521 votes, which is 45.69% of the total votes cast.

Aam Aadmi Party emerged as the main opposition party in the Punjab Assembly elections of 2017. Aam Aadmi Party secured 20 seats in the Punjab Assembly in the Punjab Assembly elections of 2017. Saravjit Kaur Manuke was elected by the Aam Aadmi Party in Punjab as deputy leader of AAP legislative party during the term of the Fifteenth Punjab Legislative Assembly. During her time in office, Harpal Singh Cheema was the Leader of the Opposition in Punjab.

In June 2021, Manuke held hunger strike along with AAP activists to protest against the inaction of the Punjab government in the payment of post-matric scholarship amount of Dalit students. AAP Punjab president Bhagwant Mann said that the protest by AAP members had forced the Punjab government led by CM Amarinder Singh to release the funds amounting to 200 crore as 40% share of the amount that Punjab government had to pay.

Her term ended with the dissolution of the Fifteenth Punjab assembly on 11 March 2022. The dissolution was necessitated after the results of the election was declared on 10 March.
Committee assignments of Punjab Legislative Assembly
 Member Committee on Questions & References
 Member Committee on Papers laid/to be laid on the table and Library
 Member Committee on Subordinate Legislation

Member of Legislative Assembly (Second term)
She was reelected from Jagraon in the 2022 Punjab Legislative Assembly election. She defeated the SAD candidate, a former MLA and bureaucrat, by more than 39,000 votes. The Aam Aadmi Party gained a strong 79% majority in the sixteenth Punjab Legislative Assembly by winning 92 out of 117 seats in the 2022 Punjab Legislative Assembly election. MP Bhagwant Mann was sworn in as Chief Minister on 16 March 2022.

Committee assignments of Punjab Legislative Assembly
Chairperson (2022–23) Committee on Co-operation and its allied activities

Social service
She is involved in social service outside politics. She is involved with the Jagran Economic Club.

Electoral performance

References

Living people
1972 births
Punjab, India MLAs 2017–2022
Place of birth missing (living people)
People from Ludhiana district
Aam Aadmi Party politicians from Punjab, India
Punjab, India MLAs 2022–2027
21st-century Indian women politicians
Women members of the Punjab Legislative Assembly